"Send Me the Pillow You Dream On" is a country song written and recorded by Hank Locklin. The song has become a standard for the Nashville sound, and has been covered by pop, country, and bluegrass artists.

Locklin first released the song in 78-disc 4 Star Records 1360 in September 1949, but it did not hit the charts. Locklin re-released it in December 1957 on RCA Victor 47-7127 single, and it peaked at No. 5 on Billboards chart of "Most Played C&W by Jockeys" and crossed over to the pop charts. There is some ambiguity about the song's title:  the original 1949 version and occasional later ones render it as "Send Me the Pillow That You Dream On", the phrase used consistently in the lyrics, but most versions use the shorter  title.

Cover versions
In the 1960s, the song was a hit for 
The Browns
 Johnny Tillotson
Dean Martin.
Among the many other artists who have recorded cover versions of the song are:

Jerry Lee Lewis
Connie Francis
Hank Williams Jr.
Daniel O'Donnell
Dolly Parton
The Everly Brothers
Foster and Allen
Jerry Vale
Loretta Lynn
Marty Wilde
Pat Boone
Roy Rogers
Slim Whitman
Willie Nelson and Hank Snow
Dwight Yoakam on his album Buenas Noches from a Lonely Room
The Whites

Chart performance

Hank Locklin

Lydia and her Melody Strings

The Browns

Johnny Tillotson

Dean Martin

The Whites

References 

1949 singles
1958 singles
1960 singles
1962 singles
1965 singles
1981 singles
Hank Locklin songs
Johnny Tillotson songs
The Browns songs
The Whites songs
Dean Martin songs
1949 songs
Songs written by Hank Locklin